Saints Peter and Paul Roman Catholic Church, established in 1865 in Wilmington, Los Angeles, California, is one of the oldest parishes in the Archdiocese of Los Angeles.

The current church building was dedicated in 1931. During the year 2000 Jubilee, it was proclaimed as a Pilgrimage Church and recognized as the Historic Faith Center of the San Pedro Pastoral Region. It is currently ran by the Norbertine Fathers of St. Michael's Abbey (Orange County, California).

External links
Official SS. Peter and Paul's Church website 

Roman Catholic churches in Los Angeles
Peter and Paul, Saints
Wilmington, Los Angeles
Roman Catholic churches completed in 1931
Peter and Paul
20th-century Roman Catholic church buildings in the United States